The Greatest Hits of All is a compilation album by American singer and guitarist George Benson, released on July 8, 2003, by Warner Bros. Records and Rhino Entertainment. The compilation received this title for containing the greatest hits of Benson's career and also in reference to the song "The Greatest Love of All", originally recorded by Benson in 1977 especially to be the main theme of the film The Greatest, a biopic of the boxer Muhammad Ali. The song is featured on this album alongside Benson's other big hits. The songs are in chronological order, between 1976 and 1998, since "This Masquerade" and "Breezin'", including his most famous hits like "On Broadway", "Give Me the Night", "Turn Your Love Around", "Lady Love Me (One More Time)", "Kisses in the Moonlight" and others. The compilation entered the Billboard and reached number 3 on the Jazz Albums. At the end of the year, the album ranked number 15 on the Top Contemporary Jazz Albums. The album also ranked number 74 on R&B Albums and number 138 on Billboard 200.

A different international version of this album was also released, entitled The Very Best of George Benson: The Greatest Hits of All.

Track listing
These are "the greatest hits of all" present in this Benson compilation:

Chart positions

Weekly charts

Year-end charts

Personnel
Information taken from the back cover of the compilation:

Compilation producers:
 George Benson
 Scott Galloway
 David McLees

Songs producers:
 Tommy LiPuma (tracks 1, 2, 4, 5, 6)
 Michael Masser (track 3)
 Quincy Jones (tracks 7, 8)
 Jay Graydon (track 9, 11)
 Arif Mardin (tracks 10, 12, 13)
 Russ Titelman (tracks 14, 15)
 Narada Michael Walden (tracks 16, 17)
 Preston Glass (track 17)
 David Lewis, Wayne Lewis, Jonathan Lewis (track 18)
 Paul Brown (track 19)

Executive producer:
 Dennis Turner

Sound producer:
 Bill Inglot

Management:
 Turner Management Group, Inc.
 Dennis Turner
 Stephanie Gurevitz-Gonzalez

References

George Benson albums
2003 greatest hits albums
Warner Records compilation albums
Rhino Records compilation albums